Frank R. Speer (May 27, 1907 – June 10, 1938) was a college football player and wrestler.

College football
Speer was an All-American tackle for the Georgia Tech Yellow Jackets of the Georgia Institute of Technology;  part of its national championship team of 1928. He first made the All-Southern team as a sophomore in 1927. One writer in 1930 said Vance Maree and Frank Speer had the reputation as "the toughest pair of tackles in the south." Speer is a member of the Georgia Tech Athletics Hall of Fame.

Wrestling
Speer once lost in a wrestling match with Bronko Nagurski due to a kneeing foul. In another wrestling match, he caused former World Heavyweight Champion Jack Dempsey, who was officiating the contest, to knock him out.

On June 1, 1938, Speer became ill but still participated in a wrestling match with Dorv Roche at Atlanta's Warren Arena. Following the match, he developed a fever and was taken to a hospital, where he died June 10 of bronchial pneumonia. He is interred at Atlanta's Hollywood Cemetery.

References

1907 births
1938 deaths
Georgia Tech Yellow Jackets football players
American football tackles
All-Southern college football players
American male sport wrestlers
Players of American football from Atlanta